Charles Edward Duffee (January 27, 1866 in Mobile, Alabama – December 24, 1894 in Mobile, Alabama), was a Major League Baseball outfielder from -, for the St. Louis Browns, Cincinnati Reds, Columbus Solons, and Washington Senators. He left baseball because he was in poor health. He died on Christmas Eve of 1894 at age 28.

References

External links

1866 births
1894 deaths
Major League Baseball outfielders
Baseball players from Alabama
St. Louis Browns (AA) players
Washington Senators (1891–1899) players
Cincinnati Reds players
Columbus Solons players
19th-century baseball players
Acid Iron Earths players
Birmingham Ironmakers players
Mobile Swamp Angels players
Birmingham Maroons players
New Orleans Pelicans (baseball) players
Atlanta Windjammers players